Juan Ignacio de la Carrera Yturgoyen (31 July 1620 – 27 March 1682) was a Spanish soldier known for his career in colonial administration of Chile and for being the original patriarch of the Carrera family, a family that had outstanding public participation during the nineteenth century, especially during the Independence of Chile.

He was born in Alegria de Oria, Gipuzkoa, Basque Country, Spain and died in Santiago, Chile.

He married Catalina de Elguea y Cáceres (granddaughter of the Judeo-converso Diego Garcia de Caceres), with whom he had ten children, including Miguel de la Carrera, ancestor of the Carrera family, and Mariana de la Carrera Elguea common trunk on the Montt family tree. He also had three illegitimate children.

Career
Juan Ignacio arrived in Chile and landed in the city of Concepción del Nuevo Extremo on April 4, 1639. During his political career he held the following roles:
Mayor of Santiago in 1655 during the Great Uprising
Field Master of the Royal Army in 1656 and 1668.
Encomendero of Peteroa and Malloa of March 26, 1656, (vacated by the death of Luis Jufré).
Founding of Fort de la Encarnación in 1666
Knight of the Order of Alcántara 1663
Governor of the Royal Arms 1663, 1669
Governor of Valdivia 1671–1673
Mayor of Santiago in 1676.

1620 births
1682 deaths
Mayors of Santiago
People of the Arauco War
Royal Governors of Chiloé
Carrera family